Alexandre Luiz Fernandes  (born 21 January 1986), commonly known as Alê, is a Brazilian footballer who plays as a defensive midfielder for CA Juventus.

Club statistics

Honours
São Paulo
São Paulo State League: 2005

Contract
Atlético Mineiro: 14 September 2010 to 14 September 2014
Americana Futebol Ltda.: 2 May 2011 to 31 December 2011 (on loan)

External links

1986 births
Living people
Footballers from São Paulo
Brazilian footballers
Association football midfielders
Campeonato Brasileiro Série A players
Campeonato Brasileiro Série B players
Campeonato Brasileiro Série C players
São Paulo FC players
Clube Atlético Juventus players
Botafogo de Futebol e Regatas players
Esporte Clube Santo André players
Club Athletico Paranaense players
Clube Atlético Mineiro players
Avaí FC players
Associação Portuguesa de Desportos players
Rio Claro Futebol Clube players
J2 League players
Cerezo Osaka players
Brazilian expatriate footballers
Brazilian expatriate sportspeople in Japan
Expatriate footballers in Japan